Matthias Zimmermann is the name of:

Matthias Zimmermann (footballer, born 1970), German football player, retired
Matthias Zimmermann (footballer, born 1992), German football player for VfB Stuttgart
Matthias Zimmermann (artist) (born 1981), media artist from Switzerland